Samuel Hulbert Turner (Philadelphia, 1790-1861) was an American Hebraist. He was professor of the Hebrew Language and Literature at the General Theological Seminary of the Episcopal Church in New York City from 1830. He was tutor and mentor to Joseph Schereschewsky, later Anglican Bishop of Shanghai.

References

1790 births
1861 deaths
American Hebraists
American biblical scholars
General Theological Seminary faculty